The Qatar Ladies Open was a golf tournament on the Ladies European Tour first played in 2016. It is played at the Doha Golf Club in Qatar.

Winners

References

External links
Coverage on the Ladies European Tour's official site

Former Ladies European Tour events
Golf tournaments in Qatar